KGTN-LP (106.7 FM) is a radio station broadcasting a Variety format. Licensed to Georgetown, Texas, United States, it serves the Georgetown area. The station is currently owned by Power Radio Corporation.

On March 19, 2009, the Federal Communications Commission (FCC) found that this station had aired eight different commercials "several thousand times" over a 14-month period, and levied a $20,000 fine. This wasn't the first time the then-KXPW-LP got in trouble with the FCC. Back in 2003, the commission received a complaint stating that KXPW-LP broadcast prohibited underwriting announcements, and sent an inquiry to its parent owner.

References

External links
 

GTN-LP
Community radio stations in the United States
GTN-LP
Radio stations established in 2003
2003 establishments in Texas